Emanuel Jesus Bonfim Evaristo (born 28 August 1982), known as Manú, is a Portuguese former footballer who played mainly as a right winger.

He played 129 Primeira Liga matches over seven seasons, totalling 13 goals for Alverca, Estrela da Amadora, Benfica, Marítimo and Vitória de Setúbal. He also competed professionally in Italy, Greece, Poland, China and Cyprus, winning the Polish Cup with Legia Warsaw.

Club career
Born in Setúbal, Manú started his professional career in the 2001–02 season playing for F.C. Alverca, before signing for S.L. Benfica in 2004 on a four-year contract. He was immediately loaned after arriving, serving stints in Italian clubs Modena F.C. and A.C. Carpenedolo to gain experience, and returned to Portugal in the 2005–06 campaign for another temporary spell with C.F. Estrela da Amadora, where he played in 31 league games and scored seven goals, contributing to the preservation of the side's Primeira Liga status.

Manú was given a new four-year deal in June 2006, and made his official debut for Benfica by playing in both legs of the UEFA Champions League third qualifying round win against FK Austria Wien, also making a substitute appearance for them in the group stages against F.C. Copenhagen, on 13 September 2006 (0–0 away draw).

Thanks to his time in Italy, Manú attracted interest from the likes of Udinese Calcio and Parma F.C. in the summer of 2007. Finally, Greek team AEK Athens F.C. managed to sign him on a one-year loan, after which he returned to Lisbon, being immediately sold to C.S. Marítimo.

Manú scored his first goal for the Madeirans on 7 October 2008, in a 2–0 away victory over Vitória de Setúbal. In his second year he appeared even more as a starter, as the side qualified for the UEFA Europa League as fifth. On 1 November 2009, he netted from 30 meters to put Marítimo ahead at Sporting CP (eventually 1–1 draw).

On 9 June 2010, Manú agreed to a three-year deal with Legia Warsaw in Poland. On 3 May of the following year, he scored the equalising goal in the season's Polish Cup final against Lech Poznań, which secured his team extra time and then a penalty shootout, in an eventual 5–4 win for the 14th conquest in the competition in the club's history.

On 9 December 2011, Manú signed a "1+1" contract with Beijing Guoan F.C. in China, effective as of January of the following year.

Career statistics

Honours
Legia Warsaw
Polish Cup: 2010–11, 2011–12

References

External links

1982 births
Living people
Sportspeople from Setúbal
Portuguese footballers
Association football wingers
Primeira Liga players
Liga Portugal 2 players
Campeonato de Portugal (league) players
F.C. Alverca players
S.L. Benfica footballers
C.F. Estrela da Amadora players
C.S. Marítimo players
Vitória F.C. players
U.D. Vilafranquense players
Serie B players
Serie D players
Modena F.C. players
Super League Greece players
AEK Athens F.C. players
Ekstraklasa players
Legia Warsaw players
Chinese Super League players
Beijing Guoan F.C. players
Cypriot First Division players
Ermis Aradippou FC players
Portuguese expatriate footballers
Expatriate footballers in Italy
Expatriate footballers in Greece
Expatriate footballers in Poland
Expatriate footballers in China
Expatriate footballers in Cyprus
Portuguese expatriate sportspeople in Italy
Portuguese expatriate sportspeople in Greece
Portuguese expatriate sportspeople in Poland
Portuguese expatriate sportspeople in China
Portuguese expatriate sportspeople in Cyprus